Agneta Gille (born 1956 in Österbybruk) is a Swedish social democratic politician. She was a member of the Riksdag 2002–2018.

External links
Agneta Gille at the Riksdag website

1956 births
Living people
People from Östhammar Municipality
Members of the Riksdag from the Social Democrats
Women members of the Riksdag
Members of the Riksdag 2002–2006
21st-century Swedish women politicians
Members of the Riksdag 2006–2010
Members of the Riksdag 2010–2014
Members of the Riksdag 2014–2018